is a Japanese baseball player. He played professionally as a  pitcher for the Chunichi Dragons in Nippon Professional Baseball.

Professional career

Chunichi Dragons
In the 2015 off-season he along with team mates Iori Katsura, Shuhei Takahashi, Shota Tomonaga and Tomohiro Hamada were loaned to the Taiwanese winter league 

On 29 March 2016, he was loaned to the Kagawa Olive Guyners in the Shikoku Island League Plus.

On 16 November 2016, Kishimoto was given a first team contract including a number change from 202 to 59.

After failing to reach the first team in 2017, Kishimoto was released by the Dragons and subsequently joined Hitachi Baseball Club in the industrial leagues to reignite his career.

External links
 Dragons.jp
 NPB.jp

References

1996 births
Living people
People from Sabae, Fukui
Baseball people from Fukui Prefecture
Japanese baseball players
Nippon Professional Baseball pitchers
Chunichi Dragons players